Lake Bob Sandlin State Park is located around Lake Bob Sandlin in Northeast Texas, in the Pineywoods region. The lake lies in Titus, Camp, and Franklin Counties, with a small part in the northeast corner of Wood County. The park covers 639.8 acres of land on the northern shore of the lake in Titus County about 10 miles southwest of Mount Pleasant.

History

The land in the area was occupied by the Caddo people until the mid-1800s.  Fort Sherman, a Republic of Texas stockade, was established by 1838, and eventually the land was used for farming and ranching by settlers, until it was acquired by Texas Parks and Wildlife Department in 1978.

Facilities and activities

The park offers over 3 miles of hiking and biking trails, a fishing pier and boat ramp, and opportunities for picnicking, geocaching, kayaking, and other outdoor activities. It also features campgrounds with hookups, covered shelters, and primitive cabins for overnight stays.

Flora and fauna

The park is located at the intersection of the Piney Woods and Blackland Prairie ecoregions, and thus has a diverse variety of wildlife. There are at least 188 bird species that have been sighted in the park, and the lake offers many species of fish, including Florida bass, and channel catfish.

References

External links
 Lake Bob Sandlin State Park - official site
 U.S. Geological Survey Map at the U.S. Geological Survey Map Website. Retrieved February 14, 2023.

State parks of Texas
Protected areas of Titus County, Texas